Confederation of Workers from Turkey in Europe, ( or ATİK) is European migrant worker organization.

History 

ATİK was founded in 1986. The first section was founded in Germany under the name of ATIF.

Repressions 

On 15 April 2015 in Germany, Greece, France and Switzerland ATIK activists have been arrested and accused of membership in the TKP/ML - illegal revolutionary organization.

Organization 
Yılmaz Güneş is leader of ATİK since 2011.

New Democratic Youth ( or YDG) is the youth organization of ATİK.

New Women - is women's right organization related to ATİK.

Regional sections 

 The Federation of Workers from Turkey in Germany ( or ATIF)
 The Federation of Workers and Youth from Turkey in Austria ( or ATIGF)
 The Federation of Workers from Turkey in Holland ( or HTIF)
 The Federation of Workers from Turkey in Switzerland ( or ITIF)
 France Committee
 England Committee
 Greece Committee

See also 
 Turkish diaspora
 Turks in Germany
 Migrant worker
 Immigration law
 Maoist insurgency in Turkey

References

External links 
  
 

Turkish diaspora in Europe
Trade unions in Germany
Maoist organizations in Europe
Communist organisations in Germany